Joshter Andrew (born 11 March 1998) is a Guamanian male judoka who competed at the 2020 Summer Olympics.

Early and personal life
Andrew was born on 11 March 1998 in Guam. He started training in judo in 2013. After finishing high school he moved to Japan in 2017. He received an Olympic Solidarity scholarship and he studied business law at Ryutsu Keizai University.

Career
He won a gold medal in the -81kg event at the 2019 Pacific Games in Apia, Samoa. He was selected to compete in the Judo at the 2020 Summer Olympics – Men's 81 kg where he was defeated by Akmal Murodov.

References

External links
 

Living people
1998 births
Guamanian male judoka
Olympic judoka of Guam
Judoka at the 2020 Summer Olympics